Membrane-spanning 4-domains subfamily A member 3 is a protein that in humans is encoded by the MS4A3 gene.

This gene encodes a member of the membrane-spanning 4A gene family. Members of this protein family are characterized by common structural features and similar intron/exon splice boundaries and display unique expression patterns among hematopoietic cells and nonlymphoid tissues. This family member likely plays a role in signal transduction and may function as a subunit associated with receptor complexes. The gene encoding this protein is localized to 11q12, among a cluster of related family members. Alternative splicing may result in multiple transcript variants; however, not all variants have been fully described.

Interactions
MS4A3 has been shown to interact with CDKN3.

References

Further reading